Argoules is a commune in the Somme department in Hauts-de-France in northern France.

Geography

Population

Places and monuments
Argoules village is next to the Cistercian Abbey of Valloires, founded in the 13th century, then rebuilt in the 18th century. The abbey grounds now contain notable, contemporary gardens (the Jardins de Valloires).

See also
 Communes of the Somme department

References

External links

(All French language)
 Jardins de Valloires on the "Baie de Somme" website

Communes of Somme (department)